

Events 
 January–March 
 January 15 – King Philip V of Spain abdicates the throne in favour of his 16-year-old son Louis I.
 January 18 – The Dutch East India Company cargo ship Fortuyn, on its maiden voyage, departs from the Cape of Good Hope in South Africa after a layover of 16 days following its arrival from the Netherlands.  With a crew of 225 commanded by Pieter Westrik, the ship departs for Batavia in the Dutch East Indies and is never seen again.
 January 22 – Bruno Mauricio de Zabala, Spanish Captain general of the Río de la Plata, forces the Portuguese to abandon their fortified settlement at what will become the city of Montevideo in Uruguay.
 January 28 – Saint Petersburg State University is established in Russia.
 February 8 – Catherine I of Russia is officially named tsaritsa by her husband, Peter the Great.
 February 20 – The premiere of Giulio Cesare, an Italian opera by George Frideric Handel, takes place in London.
 March 7 – Pope Innocent XIII dies at the age of 68 after less than three years as the Roman Catholic pontiff.
 March 20 – The conclave to elect a new Pope opens in Rome, 13 days after the death of Innocent XIII.  Starting with 33 electors and eventually having 53, the conclave deliberates for more than two months before selecting a successor.

 April–June 
 April 7 – The premiere performance, of the St John Passion (BWV 245) of Johann Sebastian Bach, takes place at St. Nicholas Church, Leipzig.
 April 28 – The first of the seven "Drapier's Letters" satirical pamphlets, seeking to turn British public opinion against Ireland, is distributed by Jonathan Swift, who writes under the pseudonym "M. B., Drapier", identifying himself as a drapier or seller of cloth.
 May 13 – Cardinal Giulio Piazza, the Archbishop of Faenza, comes within four votes of being elected the new Pope
 May 29 – Cardinal Vincenzo Orsini, the Archbishop of Benevento, accepts the papacy, two days after being unanimously selected by the cardinals at the papal conclave in Rome.  He becomes the 245th pontiff as Pope Benedict XIII.
 June 23 – The Treaty of Constantinople is signed, partitioning Persia between the Ottoman Empire and Russia.

 July–September 
 July 27 – Peter the Wild Boy is captured near Helpensen in Hanover.
 July 31 – The Hyderabad State is created in India, as the Mughal Emperor, Muhammad Shah rewards his associate Mir Qamar-ud-din Khan.  Qamar-ud-din becomes the first Nizam of Hyderabad.  The princely state exists for more than 220 years, coming to an end after India's independence from Britain.
 August 31 – Louis I of Spain dies of smallpox, aged 17, after a reign of seven months, and his father Philip V resumes the throne.
September 4 – José de Grimaldo, who had been Prime Minister for Spain's King Philip V until the latter's abdication in January, resumes office with the return of King Philip.
September 24 –  The Paris Bourse, the stock exchange for France, is created by order of King Louis XV on the advice of Nicolas Ravot d'Ombreval, four years after a financial panic had shut down trading.  Stock markets had already been set up in Lyon, Bourdeaux and Toulouse.

 October–December 
 October 2 – Muhammad bin Nasir is elected as the new Imam of Oman after the overthrow of his brother, Saif bin Sultan II
 October 15 – The historic Teatro Nuovo opera house is inaugurated in Naples with the premiere of Antonio Orefice's comic opera Lo Simmele. 
 October 16 – Yeongjo becomes the new Emperor of Korea after the death of his older brother, Gyeongjong.  He reigns for almost 52 years until his death on April 22, 1776.
 October 31 – George Frideric Handel's opera Tamerlano is performed for the first time, premiering in London.  The opera has been revived as recently as 2009.
 November 11 – Joseph Blake (alias Blueskin), English highwayman, is hanged in London.
 November 16
 Highwayman Jack Sheppard is hanged in London.
 Willem Mons, lover of Catherine I of Russia, is executed, and his head preserved in alcohol.
 November 19 – The Dutch East India Company frigate Slot ter Hooge strikes rocks and sinks off Porto Santo Island, Madeira, with the loss of 221 of the 254 people on board.
 December 2 – The Metropolitan Mojsije Petrović, leader of the Serbian Orthodox Church within the Habsburg monarchy, issues a 57-point decree to purge the church of the Turkish influence. 
 December 7 – 
In the aftermath of an attack against Jesuit Catholics led by the Lutheran Mayor of the Prussian City of Thorn (now Toruń in Poland), the execution of the 10 Lutheran officials (including Mayor Johann Gottfried Rösner) is carried out publicly in the town square.  Rösner and seven others are decapitated by an axe, while two others are hanged, drawn and quartered for blasphemy.
By order of the Nizam, Hyderabad is made the permanent capital of the Indian princely state of the same name.  It is now the capital of the Indian states of Telangana and Andhra Pradesh
 December 14 – The Viceroyalty of Zhili (now the Hebei province) is recreated in the Chinese Empire by the Emperor Yongzheng for the first time in 55 years, with Li Weijun as the first Viceory.  Zhili exists as a viceroyalty until the fall of the Qing dynasty in 1912.
 December 24 – Francesco Valesio resumes writing his Diario di Roma, 13 years after he ceased his recording of daily life in Rome.

 Date unknown 
 China expels foreign missionaries.
 Blenheim Palace construction is completed in England. It is presented as a gift from the nation to the Duke of Marlborough, for his involvement in the Battle of Blenheim in 1704.
 The Austrian Netherlands agree to the Pragmatic Sanction.
 Shah Mahmud Hotaki of Afghanistan goes insane.
 Longman, the oldest surviving publishing house in England, is founded.
 The Kaitokudō academy merchant school, as predecessor for part of Ōsaka University was founded in Ōsaka, Japan.

Births 

 January 12 – Frances Brooke, English writer (d. 1789)
 February 16 – Christopher Gadsden, American statesman (d. 1805)
 February 28 – George Townshend, 1st Marquess Townshend, British field marshal (d. 1807)
 February 29 – Eva Marie Veigel, Austrian-born English ballet dancer, known as La Violette (d. 1822)
 March 1 – Manuel do Cenáculo, Portuguese prelate and antiquarian (d. 1814)
 March 6 – Henry Laurens, political leader during the American Revolutionary War, father of John Laurens (d. 1792) 
 March 27 – Jane Colden, American botanist (d. 1766) 
 April 12 – Lyman Hall, American signer of the Declaration of Independence (d. 1790)
 April 22 – Immanuel Kant, German philosopher (d. 1804)
 May 7 – Dagobert Sigmund von Wurmser, Alsatian-born Austrian general (d. 1797)
 May 19 – Augustus Hervey, 3rd Earl of Bristol, British admiral, politician (d. 1779)
 June 8 – John Smeaton, English civil engineer (d. 1792)
 June 15 – Countess Palatine Maria Franziska of Sulzbach, German aristocrat (d. 1794)
 July 2 – Friedrich Gottlieb Klopstock, German poet (d. 1803)
 July 10 – Eva Ekeblad, Swedish scientist (d. 1786)
 August 23 – Abraham Yates, American Continental Congressman (d. 1796)
 August 25 – George Stubbs, English painter (d. 1806)
 August 27 – John Joachim Zubly, Swiss-born Continental Congressman (d. 1781)
 September 3 – Guy Carleton, 1st Baron Dorchester, British soldier and Governor of Quebec (d. 1808)
 December 12 – Samuel Hood, 1st Viscount Hood, British admiral (d. 1816)
 December 13 – Franz Aepinus, German scientist (d. 1802)
 December 18 – Louise of Great Britain, queen of Frederick V of Denmark (d. 1751)
 December 24 – Johann Conrad Ammann, Swiss physician,  naturalist (d. 1811)
 December 25 – John Michell, English scientist and geologist (d. 1793)
 December 28 – Christoph Franz von Buseck, Prince-Bishop of Bamberg (d. 1805)
 December 30 – Louis-Jean-François Lagrenée, French painter (d. 1805)
 Date unknown
 Marie Anne Victoire Pigeon, French mathematician (d. 1767)
 James MacLaine, Irish highwayman (d. 1750)

Deaths 

 January 20 – William Lowndes, English politician (b. 1652)
 February 19 – Pieter Schuyler, British colonial military leader, acting governor of New York (b. 1657)
 March 4 – Princess Eleonore Juliane of Brandenburg-Ansbach, duchess by marriage of Württemberg-Winnental (b. 1663)
 March 7 – Pope Innocent XIII (b. 1655)
 March 10 – Urban Hjärne, Swedish chemist (b. 1641)
 March 15 –  Regent Marie Jeanne Baptiste of Savoy-Nemours (b. 1644)
 March 19 – Lewis Watson, 1st Earl of Rockingham, English politician (b. 1655)
 March 31 – Sophia of Saxe-Weissenfels, Princess of Anhalt-Zerbst (b. 1654)
 April 28 – Streynsham Master, English colonial administrator (b. 1640)
 May 3 – John Leverett the Younger, American President of Harvard (b. 1662)
 May 21 – Robert Harley, 1st Earl of Oxford and Earl Mortimer, English statesman (b. 1661)
 June – Magdelaine Chapelain, French fortune teller and poisoner (b. 1651)
 June 11 – Ludovico Sabbatini, Italian Roman Catholic priest and saint (b. 1650)
 June 15 – Henry Sacheverell, English churchman and politician (b. 1674)
 June 24 – Johann Theile, German composer and organist (b. 1646)
 July 1 – Johann Homann, German cartographer (b. 1664)
 July 2 – Thomas Maule, prominent Quaker in colonial Salem (b. 1645)
 July 13 – Sir Richard Levinge, 1st Baronet, British politician (b. 1656)
 July 31 – Claude de Ramezay, Canadian politician (b. 1659)
 August 2 – Patrick Hume, 1st Earl of Marchmont, Scottish statesman (b. 1641)
 August 6 – Samson Wertheimer, European rabbi (b. 1658)
 August 21 – Noël Alexandre, French theologian and ecclesiastical historian (b. 1639)
 August 24 – Andreas Kneller, German organist and composer (b. 1649)
 August 31 – King Louis I of Spain (b. 1707)
 October 2 – François-Timoléon de Choisy, French writer (b. 1644)
 October 18 – Jean de Hautefeuille, French cleric, scientist (b. 1647)
 October 29 – William Wollaston, English philosophical writer (b. 1659)
 October 30 – Marie of Lorraine, French princess (b. 1674)
 November 7 – John Kyrle, British philanthropist (b. 1637)
 November 14 – John Murray, 1st Duke of Atholl (b. 1660)
 November 16 – Jack Sheppard, British criminal (executed) (b. 1702)
 November 18 – Bartolomeu de Gusmão, Portuguese naturalist (b. 1685)
 November 24 – Ernst Ludwig I, Duke of Saxe-Meiningen (b. 1672)
 November 28 – Robert Marsham, 1st Baron Romney, British politician (b. 1685)
 December 27 – Thomas Guy, English philanthropist (b. 1644)

References 

 
Leap years in the Gregorian calendar